The members of the New South Wales Legislative Assembly who served in the 20th parliament of New South Wales from 1904 to 1907 were elected at the 1904 state election on 6 August 1904. The Speaker was William McCourt.

By-elections

The 20th New South Wales Legislative Assembly was the last parliament in which ministers were required to resign and contest a by-election on appointment.

See also
Carruthers ministry
Results of the 1904 New South Wales state election
Candidates of the 1904 New South Wales state election

References

Members of New South Wales parliaments by term
20th-century Australian politicians